Zikisso is a town in southern Ivory Coast. It is a sub-prefecture and commune of Lakota Department in Lôh-Djiboua Region, Gôh-Djiboua District.

In 2014, the population of the sub-prefecture of Zikisso was 9,698.

Villages
The 5 villages of the sub-prefecture of Zikisso and their population in 2014 are:

 Bogoboua (2 353)
 Gogohouri (363)
 Makobéri (1 205)
 Niagbaméko (538)
 Zikisso (5 239)

References

Sub-prefectures of Lôh-Djiboua
Communes of Lôh-Djiboua